Heterogenea is a genus of moths belonging to the family Limacodidae.

The species of this genus are found in Europe, Easternmost Asia and Northern America.

Species:
 Heterogenea asella (Denis & Schiffermuller, 1775)
 Heterogenea shurtleffi Packard, 1864

References

Limacodidae
Moth genera